Lake Muskoka/Milford Bay Water Aerodrome  is located adjacent to Milford Bay, Ontario, Canada.

References

Registered aerodromes in Ontario
Transport in the District Municipality of Muskoka
Seaplane bases in Ontario